John Musgrove can refer to:

 John Musgrove (cricketer) (1861-1940), Australian cricketer
 John Musgrove (politician), American politician
 Sir John Musgrove, 1st Baronet (1793-1881), British politician